"Grave Danger" is an episode of the American crime drama CSI: Crime Scene Investigation

Grave Danger may also refer to:

 David Granger (footballer) (aka Grave Danger, born 1955), Australian rules footballer
 "Grave Danger" (The Cleveland Show), a 2013 episode of The Cleveland Show
 "Grave Danger" (Lego Ninjago: Masters of Spinjitzu), a 2015 episode of Lego Ninjago: Masters of Spinjitzu
 Grave Danger, a Hardy Boys mystery novel
 Monster Madness: Grave Danger, a 2008 video game published by SouthPeak Games
Grave Danger, a 2005 Rat City Rollergirls roller derby team